Mikołaj Wisznicki (1870–1954) was a Polish painter, military officer and one of the founders of Polish Sightseeing Society (Polskie Towarzystwo Krajoznawcze).

Trained in the natural sciences at the University of Kyiv, he was primarily known as an illustrator of children's literature. In addition, he painted oil and watercolor landscapes and equine scenes. Later, after study in the workshop of Konrad Krzyżanowski, he also practiced portrait painting.

External links
 Mikołaj Wisznicki
 Life of Mikołaj Wisznicki

19th-century Polish painters
19th-century Polish male artists
20th-century Polish painters
20th-century Polish male artists
1870 births
1954 deaths
Polish male painters